The Weaver Mountains are a smaller mountain range to the southwest of the Bradshaw Mountains in central-west Yavapai County, Arizona. Yarnell, at the summit of the Yarnell Hill, Arizona State Route 89, is at the center of the range.

Description

The range is northwest–southeast trending, but more due east on the east end. The northeast, east, and southeast is separated from the Bradshaw Mountains by the Hassayampa River. A list of peaks in the range, from the northwest are: Ritter Peak, Weaver Peak, Rocky Boy Peak, Antelope Peak, Rich Hill, Weaver Mountain, and Wades Butte. Sam Powell Peak and Seal Mountain border the Hassayampa River. At the west and southwest, Cottonwood Creek and a valley separates the Weaver Mountains from a smaller mountain range to the southwest, the Date Creek Mountains.

History and attractions

The Weaver Mountains are noted for their mines; also placer gold.

References

External links
 Arizona Mountain Ranges, Primary Table, at peakbagging.com
 Arizona's Top 100 Peaks, summitpost.org
 Weaver Peak, mountainzone

Arizona transition zone mountain ranges
Mountain ranges of Yavapai County, Arizona
Mountain ranges of Arizona